Henry R. Grant was a pioneer college football player at Harvard University, the team's first captain. He played the game intramurally even before Harvard's first season in 1873.

See also
 1874 Harvard vs. McGill football game

References

Harvard Crimson football players
American football halfbacks
19th-century players of American football
Year of birth missing
Year of death missing